The Nelson House is a historic house at 303 St. Andrew's Terrace in West Helena, Arkansas.  It is a -story wood-frame and brick structure, with a full-width front porch, and a rear single-story ell.  The house has modest Colonial Revival styling, but is fundamentally an excellent local example of the American Foursquare architectural style.  It was built c. 1915, and is one of a modest number of homes from that period to survive in West Helena.

The house was listed on the National Register of Historic Places in 1996.

See also
National Register of Historic Places listings in Phillips County, Arkansas

References

Houses on the National Register of Historic Places in Arkansas
Houses completed in 1915
Houses in Phillips County, Arkansas
National Register of Historic Places in Phillips County, Arkansas